"Newborn Friend" is a song by Seal. It was released as the third single from his second studio album Seal (aka Seal II) in October 1994, and peaked at number 45 in the UK Singles Chart.

Releases
UK and Germany CD (1994) 
"Newborn Friend" (The Silver Mix) – 4:06
"Newborn Friend" (Morales Radio Mix) – 3:54
"Newborn Friend" (Brothers in Rhythm Club Mix) – 8:42
"Newborn Friend" (Morales Club Mix) – 9:10
"Newborn Friend" (Mo-Mo's Bass Mix) – 6:00
"Newborn Friend" (Friend For Life) – 9:02

UK remixes CD (1994) 
"Newborn Friend" (Morales Club Mix II) – 9:09
"Newborn Friend" (Morales Dub II) – 7:27
"Newborn Friend" ((Tasty) Tom Elmhirst Mix) – 10:48

UK CD promo (1994) 
"Newborn Friend" – 4:04

UK 12" (1994) 
"Newborn Friend" (Morales Club Mix) – 9:10
"Newborn Friend" (Morales Dub) – 7:26
"Newborn Friend" (Brothers in Rhythm Club Mix) – 8:42
"Newborn Friend" (Friend For Life) – 9:02

UK 12" (1994) 
"Newborn Friend" (Morales Club Mix) – 9:10
"Newborn Friend" (Morales Dub) – 7:26
"Newborn Friend" (Morales Radio Mix) – 3:54
"Newborn Friend" (Mo-Mo's Bass Mix) – 6:00

UK 12" promo (1994) 
"Newborn Friend" (Brothers in Rhythm Club Mix) – 8:42
"Newborn Friend" (Ronin Remix) –
"Newborn Friend" (Friend For Life) – 9:02
"Newborn Friend" – 4:04

UK 12" promo (1994) 
"Newborn Friend" (Morales Club Mix II) – 9:09
"Newborn Friend" (Morales Dub II) – 7:27
"Newborn Friend" ((Tasty) Tom Elmhirst Mix) – 10:48

US CD (1994) 
"Newborn Friend" (The Silver Mix) – 4:06
"Blues In 'E'" – 3:43

US CD (1994) 
"Newborn Friend" (The Silver Mix) – 4:06
"Newborn Friend" (Morales Club Mix) – 9:10
"The Wind Cries Mary" – 3:54
"Newborn Friend" (Brothers in Rhythm Club Mix) – 8:42
"Newborn Friend" (Friend For Life) – 9:02
"Blues In 'E'" – 3:43
"Newborn Friend" (Mo-Mo's Bass Mix) – 6:00
"Newborn Friend" (Morales Radio Mix) – 3:54

US CD promo (1994) 
"Newborn Friend" (The Silver Mix) – 4:06
"Newborn Friend" – 4:04

US CD promo (1994) 
"Newborn Friend" (Morales Radio Mix) – 3:54
"Newborn Friend" (Morales Club Mix) – 9:10
"Newborn Friend" (The Silver Mix) – 4:06
"Newborn Friend" – 4:04

US 12" (1994) 
"Newborn Friend" (Morales Club Mix) – 9:10
"Newborn Friend" (Morales Dub) – 7:26
"Newborn Friend" (Brothers in Rhythm Club Mix) – 8:42
"Newborn Friend" (Friend For Life) – 9:02

US 12" promo (1994) 
"Newborn Friend" (Morales Radio Mix) – 3:54
"Newborn Friend" (Morales Club Mix) – 9:10
"Newborn Friend" (Morales Dub) – 7:26
"Newborn Friend" (The Silver Mix) – 4:06
"Newborn Friend" – 4:04
"Newborn Friend" (Mo-Mo's Bass Mix) – 6:00

Charts

Weekly charts

Year-end charts

References

1994 singles
Seal (musician) songs
Songs written by Seal (musician)
Song recordings produced by Trevor Horn
1994 songs
ZTT Records singles